John Elbridge Hines (October 3, 1910 – July 19, 1997) was a bishop in the Episcopal Church in the United States. When he was elected the 22nd Presiding Bishop in 1965, at the age of 54, he was the youngest person to hold that office, which he held until 1974. Desmond Tutu, Archbishop of Cape Town, said Hines' movement to divest church-held assets in that nation played an important role in the demise of apartheid.

Early life
Hines was born in Seneca, South Carolina. He graduated from the University of the South in 1930 and Virginia Theological Seminary in Alexandria in 1933.

Ministry
His ministry began at parishes in Hannibal, Missouri in the Great Depression, where he became acquainted with the Social Gospel movement through bishop William Scarlett of Missouri. At age 26, Hines became rector of Saint Paul's Church, Augusta, Georgia, and began attacking racism in Georgia, continuing his lifelong defense of those who lacked political, social, economic and educational opportunities. Hines then accepted a call to become rector of Christ Church in Houston, Texas from 1941 to 1945, which was later raised to the status of cathedral.

Hines was consecrated as bishop coadjutor of the Episcopal Diocese of Texas on October 18, 1945, and in 1955 became diocesan bishop. While his social activism was criticized in some quarters, the number of churches grew under his stewardship. He became known as a theological conservative and social liberal, and was elected Presiding Bishop of the Episcopal Church in 1965. Hines responded to the riots following the assassination of Martin Luther King Jr. by calling for social justice and self-determination, and launched the controversial General Convention Special Program.

Death and legacy
During nearly two decades of retirement in North Carolina, Hines preached most summers at the Church of the Good Shepherd in Cashiers, North Carolina, where he was ultimately buried next to his wife, Helen Orwig, who died a year before he did. They had four sons and a daughter, who survived their parents. Hines died at Heartland Medical Center in Austin, Texas.

See also

 List of presiding bishops of the Episcopal Church in the United States of America
 List of Episcopal bishops of the United States
 Historical list of the Episcopal bishops of the United States

References

1910 births
1997 deaths
People from Seneca, South Carolina
Sewanee: The University of the South alumni
Virginia Theological Seminary alumni
20th-century American Episcopalians
Episcopal bishops of Texas
20th-century American clergy